Abdulelah Al-Zahrani (born July 21, 1986) is a Saudi football player who plays a goalkeeper .

References

1986 births
Living people
Saudi Arabian footballers
Al-Ansar FC (Medina) players
Saudi Second Division players
Saudi First Division League players
Saudi Professional League players
Association football goalkeepers